The Sigma APO 120-400mm F4.5-5.6 DG OS HSM lens is a super-telephoto lens produced by Sigma Corporation. It contains three SLD (Special Low Dispersion) glass elements to provide  correction for chromatic aberration. It is aimed toward advanced consumers.

See also
List of Nikon compatible lenses with integrated autofocus-motor

References

External links

120-400